The Master International Frequency Register (MIFR) is the formal database of satellite and terrestrial frequency assignments maintained by the International Telecommunication Union (ITU). Recording in the MIFR is the final stage of the frequency coordination process, and confers international recognition and protection from interference for those frequency assignments.

References

International Telecommunication Union